The Chroicopteridae  are a new (2019) family of praying mantids, based on the type genus Chroicoptera.  The name is derived from first use, for subfamily Chroicopterinae, by Giglio-Tos and it has been revived as part of a major revision of mantid taxonomy.  Some genera have also been moved here from the tribe Rivetinini, with others placed elsewhere including the subfamily Miomantinae.

The new placement is as a sole family in the superfamily Chroicopteroidea (of group Cernomantodea) and infraorder Schizomantodea.  Genera in this family have been recorded from Africa and islands in the Atlantic and Indian oceans.

Subfamilies, tribes and genera  
The Mantodea Species File lists two subfamilies:

Chroicopterinae 
tribe Bolbellini
 Bolbella Giglio-Tos, 1915
 Dystactula Giglio-Tos, 1927
tribe Chroicopterini
 subtribe Amphecostephanina
 Amphecostephanus Rehn, 1912
 subtribe Bisanthina
 Bisanthe  Stal, 1876
 subtribe Chroicopterina
 Betamantis Giglio-Tos, 1915
 Carvilia Stal, 1876
 Chopardentella Kaltenbach, 1996
 Chroicoptera Stal, 1871
 Congomantis Werner, 1929
 Entella Stal, 1877
 Entelloptera Beier, 1942
 Geothespis Giglio-Tos, 1916
 Ligaria Stal, 1877
 Ligariella Giglio-Tos, 1915
 Ligentella Kaltenbach, 1996
 Macracanthopus Chopard, 1929
 Namamantis Kaltenbach, 1996
 Paraligaria Beier, 1969
 Parentella Giglio-Tos, 1915
 Rhachimantis Giglio-Tos, 1915
 Sphaeromantis Schulthess, 1898
 subtribe Dystactina
 Achlaena Karsch, 1892
 Achlaenella Giglio-Tos, 1915
 Dystacta Saussure, 1871
 Pseudodystacta Kaltenbach, 1996

Tarachininae 
Auth. Giglio-Tos (1915); tropical central Africa
tribe Gonypetellini
 Gonypetella Giglio-Tos, 1915
 Telomantis Giglio-Tos, 1915
tribe Tarachinini
 Tarachina Werner, 1907

References

External links 

Mantodea families